Biesdorf-Süd is a surface level Berlin U-Bahn station located on the  line of the U-Bahn Berlin subway in the neighborhood of Biesdorf in Berlin, Germany. The station opened on 1 July, 1988. After Tierpark, It comes above ground. The next station is Elsterwerdaer Platz. North of the U-Bahn station is the Biesdorfer Baggersee.

References

U5 (Berlin U-Bahn) stations
Buildings and structures in Marzahn-Hellersdorf
Railway stations in Germany opened in 1988
1988 establishments in East Germany